Mārkalne Parish is an administrative unit of Alūksne Municipality, Latvia. The population is 510.

References

Parishes of Latvia
Alūksne Municipality